Michael Davitt Coghlan (28 December 1907 – 10 October 1964) was an Australian rules footballer who played with Fitzroy in the Victorian Football League (VFL).

Family
The son of Michael Coghlan (-1956), and Annie Coghlan (-1940), Michael Davitt Coghlan was born at Coburg, Victoria on 28 December 1907.

His brother, Arthur Emmett "Bull" Coghlan (1902-1959), played VFl football for Geelong.

He married Patricia Genevieve O'Keefe (1907-1957) in 1938.

Military service
He served with the Royal Australian Air Force in the Second World War.

Death
He died at St Vincent's Hospital in Fitzroy, Victoria on 10 October 1964.

Notes

References
 
 Victorian League Football 1928 — Fitzroy Team, The Weekly Times, (Saturday, 7 July 1928), p.45.
 W.A. Clearances, The (Adelaide) Advertiser and Register, (Friday, 17 April 1931), p.8.
 World War Two Nominal Roll: Flight Lieutenant Michail (sic) Davitt Coghlan (256690), Department of Veterans' Affairs.

External links 
 
 

1907 births
1964 deaths
Australian rules footballers from Melbourne
Fitzroy Football Club players
Subiaco Football Club players
Royal Australian Air Force personnel of World War II
Royal Australian Air Force officers
People from Coburg, Victoria
Military personnel from Melbourne